The Toronto Huskies were a team in the Basketball Association of America (BAA), which was a forerunner of the National Basketball Association (NBA), during the 1946–47 season. They were based in Toronto. The team compiled a 22–38 win–loss record in its only season before formally disbanding in the summer of 1947.

Franchise history

In 1946, a group of owners and operators of some of the larger arenas in America held a meeting in New York, to establish the Basketball Association of America (now the NBA). The majority of the would-be basketball owners were involved with the National Hockey League and wanted to fill empty dates. The only Canadian delegation invited was from Maple Leaf Gardens: Frank Selke Sr., who was in charge of the Gardens while Conn Smythe was overseas, got in touch with Ben Newman (who had coached two Canadian national championship teams and had staged a game in the Gardens previously.) The franchise cost approximately $150,000 which was funded mostly from Bay Street backers in Toronto.  The major partners in the ownership group were Eric Cradock (co-owner of the Montreal Alouettes football team), Harold Shannon and Newman.

"I honestly thought we could have made a go of the team," Newman once said, "but we were given the worst possible home dates." The hardships started almost immediately when Newman's father took ill soon after the first game, forcing Newman to leave the Huskies to take over the family scrap and steel metal business in St. Catharines, Ontario. Lack of co-operation from the local media and lack of talent on the court kept crowds low, despite the use of such gimmicks that included free stockings to all women in attendance.

On November 1, 1946, they hosted the first game in BAA league history losing 68–66 to the New York Knickerbockers before an opening night crowd of 7,090. Ossie Schectman scored the opening basket for the New York Knickerbockers against the Toronto Huskies.

On that night, anyone taller than George Nostrand, the tallest Husky at 6'8", was given free admission. Attendance quickly dwindled and the Toronto Star published an estimate that team owners lost $100,000 in one season of operations.

Managing director of the Huskies was Lew Hayman, coach and general manager of the Alouettes and future president of the Toronto Argonauts and the Canadian Football League, who had been a star basketball player at Syracuse University. Charles Watson was team president. Ben Newman and Salter Hayden were the other co-founders. Annis Stukus was also a member of the front office.

Future all-star Ed Sadowski began the season as player-coach and was initially the team's top player. Three weeks into the season, with the team off to a poor start, the Star reported that the players had divided into two or three cliques that rarely spoke to each other. Sadowski's coaching was openly questioned and, just a month after the first game, he quit the team. After four games with interim coaches (Hayman coached one game, and Huskies player Dick Fitzgerald ruled the bench for three games), Hayman hired former Major League Baseball player Red Rolfe, who had also been the coach of Yale University's basketball team.

Hayman traded the playing rights to Sadowski to the Cleveland Rebels for Leo Mogus, at the time one of the league's top scorers. Hayman had previously traded Nostrand to the Rebels for another 6'9" giant, Kleggie Hermsen. In February 1947 the Huskies acquired the tallest player in the league, 7'1" Ralph Siewert, from the St. Louis Bombers. Despite his height, Siewert averaged just 1.1 points per game with the Huskies and had the lowest field goal percentage on the team.

The team's leading scorer was Mike McCarron, with 649 points in 60 games. He and Fitzgerald were the only players to appear in every game. Sadowski had the most points per game, averaging 19.1 points over his 10 games with the Huskies. Hank Biasatti and Gino Sovran were the only Canadians on the Huskies, each playing just six games.

Neither of the Huskies' head coaches (or their interim coaches) would coach another game in the BAA/NBA after their time in Toronto. Of the 20 players to make it to the floor for the Huskies, only five would go on to play 10 or more games in the BAA/NBA following the 1946–47 season: Sadowski, Mogus, Hermsen, Nostrand, and Dick Schulz. Hermsen was the last active NBA player from the Huskies roster, retiring in 1953 as a member of the Indianapolis Olympians.

Bring back the Huskies
Reviving the Huskies name was originally considered at the time of selecting a name for Toronto's new NBA team in 1995 (marking a return of professional basketball to the city after a 48-year absence). However, management ruled that option out when it became apparent there was no way to design a suitable logo that didn't resemble that of the Minnesota Timberwolves, so they became the Toronto Raptors instead. Nevertheless, a group of fans have created a 'Bring back the Huskies' campaign, complete with a website, TorontoHuskies.org, with the intent of having the franchise revert to the historical 'Huskies' name.

On December 8, 2009, the Raptors introduced a throwback jersey to commemorate the Huskies. The uniforms were the same, except for the different team name and the shorts were longer than the originals. These uniforms were worn in six games in the 2009–10 season and have since been used as "retro" jerseys. On August 23, 2016 the Raptors unveiled the Huskies throwbacks as new alternates, along with their Chinese New Year jerseys. An alternate Air Canada Centre floor with the Huskies dog logo at centre court and the Huskies logomark text at each end was also utilized by the Raptors on these retro nights.

Season
The Huskies played only a single season and never appeared in the playoffs.

|-
|colspan="6" align="center" "|Toronto Huskies (BAA)
|-
|1946–47 ||22  ||38  ||.367 || colspan=2|Did not qualify
|-align="center" bgcolor="#efefef"
|Totals || 22  || 38  ||  || ||
|-align="center" bgcolor="#efefef"
|Playoffs || 0  || 0  ||  || ||
|-

Roster

  Mike McCarron G
  Leo Mogus F/C 
  Red Wallace G
  Dick Fitzgerald F 
  Kleggie Hermsen F/C
  Dick Schulz F/G
  Roy Hurley F/G
  Bob Mullens G
  Ed Sadowski C
  Harry Miller F/C
 / Charlie Hoefer G
  Frank Fucarino F
  Bob Fitzgerald F/C
  George Nostrand F/C
  Nat Militzok F
  Ray Wertis G
  Ralph Siewert C
  Ed Kasid G
  Gino Sovran F/G
 / Hank Biasatti G

Head coaches
 Ed Sadowski
 Lew Hayman (interim)
 Dick Fitzgerald
 Robert Rolfe

See also

Toronto Raptors
Canada Basketball

References

External links
 Toronto Huskies history and pictures.
 "1946–47 Toronto Huskies," Basketball-Reference.com, retrieved November 1, 2006

 

Huskies
Defunct National Basketball Association teams
Basketball Association of America teams
Defunct basketball teams in Canada
Basketball teams established in 1946
Basketball teams disestablished in 1947
1946 establishments in Ontario
1947 disestablishments in Ontario